Yanami (written: 八並 or 八奈見) is a Japanese surname. Notable people with the surname include:

, Japanese actress
, Japanese voice actor

See also
Yanami Station, a railway station in Noto, Ishikawa Prefecture, Japan

Japanese-language surnames